The following lists events that happened during 1948 in Cape Verde.

Incumbents
Colonial governor: João de Figueiredo

Events
Famine in Cape Verde

Births
Leão Lopes, director
March 27: Manuel Veiga, writer

References

 
1948 in the Portuguese Empire
Years of the 20th century in Cape Verde
1940s in Cape Verde
Cape Verde
Cape Verde